Pindara is a genus of moths of the family Noctuidae.

Species
Pindara illibata (Fabricius, 1775)
Pindara prisca (Walker, 1858)
Pindara serratilinea (Bethune-Baker, 1906)

References
Natural History Museum Lepidoptera genus database

Catocalinae